General Sir James Richard Hockenhull,  (born 27 July 1964) is a senior British Army officer who has served as Commander Strategic Command since May 2022.

Early life and education
Hockenhull was born on 27 July 1964 in Havant, Hampshire, England. He was educated at the Royal Hospital School, Ipswich, and the University of York.

Military career
Hockenhull was commissioned into the Intelligence Corps in 1986. He deployed to Northern Ireland multiple times during his early career, for which he was appointed a Member of the Order of the British Empire on 22 November 1994, awarded a Queen's Commendation for Valuable Service "in recognition of gallant and distinguished services" in 1999, and appointed an Officer of the Order of the British Empire on 30 September 2003.

Hockenhull became an instructor at the United States Army Command and General Staff College at Fort Leavenworth, Kansas, in 2003 before being deployed as Chief, Campaign Plans at Headquarters Multi-National Force – Iraq in December 2005, for which he was awarded the United States Bronze Star Medal in 2006. He went on to be Deputy Director Force Development in August 2006, Chief, Plans at Headquarters Allied Rapid Reaction Corps in Afghanistan in 2008 and Director ISTAR at Headquarters Land Forces in 2008. After that he became Head Military Strategic Planning at the Ministry of Defence in September 2011, Director of the Ministry of Defence Advisory Group in Kabul in June 2012, and Director Cyber, Intelligence and Information Integration in March 2015. He was awarded the United States Officer of the Legion of Merit in 2017. The following year, Hockenhull was appointed Chief of Defence Intelligence and promoted to lieutenant general. He was advanced to Knight Commander of the Order of the British Empire (KBE) in the 2021 New Year Honours.

In April 2022, it was announced that Hockenhull would be promoted to general and succeed General Sir Patrick Sanders as the commander of United Kingdom Strategic Command. He took office in May 2022.

On 13 August 2022, in an interview with the BBC, Hockenhull said: "Russia nor Ukraine is likely to achieve any decisive military action in Ukraine this year". He has defended the decision to publish the intelligence about the Russian invasion of Ukraine, saying "It's important to get the truth out before the lies come." UK intelligence is watching the prospect of tactical nuclear weapons being used in Ukraine "very closely"; he however considers their usage "very unlikely". He said of China: "incredible military modernisation with a country determined to resolve a political issue".

References

|-

1964 births
Alumni of the University of York
British Army generals
Foreign recipients of the Legion of Merit
Intelligence Corps officers
Knights Commander of the Order of the British Empire
Living people
Officers of the Legion of Merit
People educated at the Royal Hospital School
People from Havant
Recipients of the Commendation for Valuable Service